Olinescu is a Romanian surname. Notable people with the surname include:

Mălina Olinescu (1974–2011), Romanian singer
Marcel Olinescu (1896–1992), Romanian engraver

Romanian-language surnames